Aliabad (also Romanized as ‘Alīābād; also known as ‘Alīābād-e Qadim) is a village in Rizab Rural District, Qatruyeh District, Neyriz County, Fars Province, Iran. At the 2006 census, its population was 51, in 14 families.

References 

Populated places in Neyriz County